Jerzy Koszla (3 October 1935 – 17 September 1959) was a Polish luger who competed during the late 1950s. He won the silver medal in the men's doubles event at the 1958 FIL World Luge Championships in Krynica, Poland.

Koszla died the following year in a motorcycle accident.

References
Hickok sports information on World champions in luge and skeleton.
Toporowicz, Kazimierz. (1968–1969). "Jerzy Koszla" In. Polski Słownik Biograficzny, Volume XIV. 
Zieleśkiewicz, Władysław. (1992). Gwiazdy zimowych aren. Encyklopedia sportu, Warsaw. 

1935 births
1959 deaths
Road incident deaths in Poland
Motorcycle road incident deaths
Polish male lugers
Place of birth missing